Northern Air Cargo, LLC (NAC) is an American cargo airline based in Anchorage, Alaska, USA. NAC operates a small fleet of Boeing 737-300s and Boeing 737-400 freighter aircraft within the state of Alaska as well as widebody Boeing 767-300 freighter services throughout the Caribbean and South America. Other services include aircraft maintenance services through its subsidiary, Northern Air Maintenance Services, on demand charters and consolidation of cargo. With a main base at the Ted Stevens Anchorage International Airport, NAC also operates out of a hub at Miami International Airport.  NAC is a division of Saltchuk which is the corporate parent of a number of transportation and distribution companies including Aloha Air Cargo, a cargo airline based in Hawaii.

History

Northern Air Cargo, LLC was established in 1956 as a charter freight service by Robert "Bobby" Sholton and Maurice Carlson.

In 2019, NAC retired its last Boeing 737-200 freighter aircraft with the replacements being later model and improved Boeing 737-300s and 400s.

Destinations
As of February 2022, Northern Air Cargo, LLC operates scheduled freight services to the following Alaskan domestic destinations:. The company also offers charter services. 
Alaska
Anchorage (PANC / ANC)
Aniak (PANI / ANI)
Barrow / Utqiagvik (PABR / BRW)
Bethel (PABE / BET)
Deadhorse (PASC / SCC)
Dillingham (PADL / DLG)
King Salmon (PAKN / AKN)
Kotzebue (PAOT / OTZ)
Nome (PAOM / OME)
Unalakleet (PAUN / UNK)

Northern Air Cargo, LLC also operates in the following Caribbean and South American destinations:

 Caribbean
Bridgetown, Barbados (TBPB / BGI)
Kingston–Norman Manley, Jamaica (MKJP / KIN)
Montego Bay, Jamaica (MKJS / MBJ)
Port-au-Prince, Haiti (MTPP / PAP)
Port of Spain, Trinidad & Tobago (TTPP / POS)
San Juan, Puerto Rico (TJSJ / SJU)
Santo Domingo–Las Americas, Santo Domingo, Dominican Republic (MDSD / SDQ)
 South America
Georgetown–Cheddi Jagan, Guyana (SYCJ / GEO)
Lima, Peru (SPJC / LIM)
Paramaribo, Suriname (SMJP / PBM)

Fleet

Northern Air Cargo LLC's fleet as of July 2020:

Previously operated
Northern Air Cargo has previously operated the following aircraft:

Service
Northern Air Cargo, LLC (NAC) currently is contracted to handle passenger services for the following:

Scheduled Flights 
General Air Cargo Service 
Priority Air Cargo Service 
Express Air Cargo Service: 
NACPAC 
Dangerous Goods:
Charters 
Charter Services

Accidents and  incidents

 On July 20, 1996, Northern Air Cargo Flight 33, a Douglas DC-6 (registration N313RS) was flying from (Emmonak to Aniak) when it crashed as it attempted an emergency landing at Russian Mission. The emergency landing was due to the #3 engine catching fire. As the plane made its approach and when it was turning to final, its right wing was seen folded up. The plane rolled to the right, nose down and slammed into the ground. All 4 on board were killed, including a jump seat passenger, Robert West, a Bush Pilot employed by Grant Aviation. The cause of the crash was determined to be the fatigue on the engine and improper procedures, (failure to feather #3 Prop) during an emergency by the pilots on board.
 On September 25, 2001, the left wing broke off of a Northern Air Cargo Douglas DC-6BF, registration N867TA, while landing on Alpine Airstrip, AK, on a cargo flight from Deadhorse Airport. Subsequently, the aircraft veered off the left side of the runway and was destroyed in a post-crash fire. All 3 crewmembers on board survived. The aircraft was written off.

References

External links
 Northern Air Cargo

Airlines established in 1956
Airlines based in Alaska
Cargo airlines of the United States
1956 establishments in Alaska
Companies based in Anchorage, Alaska